Hania Rani (born Hanna Raniszewska; 1990) is a Polish pianist, composer and singer.

Early life and education
Rani was born in Gdańsk. She studied music at the Music School Feliks Nowowiejski in Gdańsk and the Fryderyk Chopin University of Music.

Biography 
Trained as a classical pianist, Rani began incorporating jazz into her work during music school. In 2015, she collaborated with Dobrawa Czocher on the album Biala Flaga, featuring their arrangements of music from fellow Polish Grzegorz Ciechowski. During the COVID-19 pandemic, Rani started experimenting with improvisation and composing. She now works within the post-classical (also known as neo-classical) music genre. She has blurred traditional distinctions between jazz, classical, and house music.

Discography

References

External links
 

1990 births
Polish classical pianists
Living people
Chopin University of Music alumni